Bundfald is a 1957 Danish crime drama film directed by Palle Kjærulff-Schmidt and Robert Saaskin.

Cast 
 Birgitte Bruun as Rosa Jensen
 Ib Mossin as Anton Hansen
 Ghita Nørby as Else
 Bent Christensen as Kaj Jensen
 Lone Hertz as Rita
 Preben Kaas as Egon
 Jakob Nielsen as 'Skipper'
 Christian Brochorst as "'Moster", bartender
 Jørn Jeppesen as car dealer

References

External links 

1957 films
Danish crime drama films
Films scored by Sven Gyldmark